Draconibacterium sediminis is a Gram-negative, facultatively anaerobic and rod-shaped bacterium from the genus of Draconibacterium which has been isolated from sediments from the Jiulong River in China.

References

Bacteroidia
Bacteria described in 2015